This is the list of those literary Humorist who did the works in Urdu language in the forma of both Prose and Poetry. Most of the writer comes from Pakistan and India.

List 
 Akbar Allahabadi
 Ratan Nath Dhar Sarshar
 Mirza Farhatullah Baig
 Rasheed Ahmad Siddiqui
 Azeem baig chughtai
 Zafar Ali Khan
 Josh Malihabadi
 Maulana Ghulam Rasool Mehr
 Patras Bokhari
 M. D. Taseer
 Chiragh Hasan Hasrat
 Imtiaz Ali Taj
 Kanhaiya Lal Kapoor
 Krishan Chander
 Saadat Hasan Manto 
 Shafiq-ur-Rahman
 Shaukat Thanvi
 Mushtaq Ahmad Yusufi
 Colonel Muhammad Khan
 Ibn-e-Insha
 Fikr Taunsvi
 Ibrahim Jalees
 Khalid Akhtar
 Mujtaba Hussain
 Muhammad Munawar Mirza
 Muhammad Rustam Kayani
 Zamir Jafri
 Ghulam Jilani Khan 
 Ata ul Haq Qasmi
 Haji Laq Laq
 Raja Mehdi Ali Khan
 Anwar Masood

References

External links 
 Works on Urdu Criticism

Urdu-language humorists